Clacton County High School is a co-educational secondary school and sixth form with academy status, located in Clacton-on-Sea, in the county of Essex, England.

There are over 1,700 students attending the school. It specialises in the arts and is situated next to Clacton Leisure Centre, east of the railway station.

The sixth form is working in partnership with other local schools to provide post-16 years education in the Clacton area.

History
The school was opened as a grammar school in September 1928. The official opening was on 28 November 1928 by Robert Strutt, 4th Baron Rayleigh (son of the Nobel Prize–winning physicist John Strutt, 3rd Baron Rayleigh). Pupils had to pay for the privilege of attending this school, twelve guineas per year (£12.60), as well as buy all their own books, materials and instruments. During the Second World War, a German bomber with sea mines crashed near the school on Victoria Road in April 1940. The crew and two  civilians were killed.

It became a comprehensive school in 1973. In 1998, it became an arts college. It converted to academy status on 1 April 2012. On the 1 September 2016, the school formed the Sigma Trust along with five other schools in the locality.

Notable former students
Michael Comber - Essex cricketer
Tom Eastman - footballer
Ian Westlake - footballer
Sade - soul singer

References

External links
 Clacton County High School

Clacton-on-Sea
Secondary schools in Essex
Educational institutions established in 1928
1928 establishments in England
Academies in Essex